Ingvar Pärnamäe (born 27 July 1977) is an Estonian politician and civil servant. He served as a member of the IX Riigikogu from 1999 to 2002. Elected at the age of 21, he is youngest Member of Parliament in the country's history.

He was a member of the Pro Patria and Res Publica Union (known as Isamaa since 2018) from 1995 to 2017.

References 

Living people
1977 births
Pro Patria Union politicians
Isamaa politicians
Estonian civil servants
Members of the Riigikogu, 1999–2003
University of Tartu alumni